Alhaji Imoru Egala (5 December 1916 – 1 April 1981) was a Ghanaian politician and educationist. He held various positions in government in the Gold Coast and after independence of Ghana. He was the foreign minister of Ghana in the First Republic between 1960 and 1961.

Work and politics

Minister of state (Nkrumah Government) 

He was a member of the Convention People's Party. He held various cabinet posts under Dr. Kwame Nkrumah's Convention People's Party government, including Minister for Foreign Affairs and Minister for Information. He also held the position of Minister of Health and Minister of Industries at a point in time in the Kwame Nkrumah's Convention People's Party government.

Along with serving as minister is different roles at different period in Kwame Nkrumah's administration he also served a member of parliament for the Tumu Constituency.

After the coup etat by Colonel E. Kotoka and Major Afrifa in 1966, Egala who was a well known associate of Kwame Nkrumah and a key member of his Nkrumah regime, was jailed by the military.

People's National Party 
Egala was also a founder of the People's National Party a political party which claimed to represent and continue the Nkrumah Heritage. The People's National Party  which won the 1979 presidential and parliamentary elections. He sponsored the candidacy of Dr. Hilla Limann, who became the president of the Third Republic of Ghana, because he was then serving a 12-year ban from public office in Ghana.

In January 1980, Egala began a court process against the electoral commissioner seeking redress of the court to restore his eligibility for public office back,.

Personal life 

Alhaji Imoru Egala had four wives; Hajia Amina Egala, Hajia Memuna Egala, Hajia Adisa Egala and Susie Egala along with 12 children; three boys Idris Egala, Dramani Egala and Osman Egala) and nine daughters (Zainabu Egala, Fati Egala, Rahinatu Egala, Ramatu Egala, Abiba Egala, Meri Egala, Zalia Egala, Fatima Egala and Rabi Egala).

Imoru is the maternal grandfather of Farouk Aliu Mahama.

Death 
Alhaji Imoru Egala died on 1 April 1981 in Accra, Ghana

References

1916 births
1981 deaths
Ghanaian MPs 1954–1956
Ghanaian MPs 1956–1965
Ghanaian Muslims
Foreign ministers of Ghana
Information ministers of Ghana
People's National Party (Ghana) politicians